Triad High School is a public high school in North Lewisburg, Ohio.  It is the only high school in the Triad Local School District.

Ohio High School Athletic Association State Championships

 Girls Softball – 1992

External links
 District Website

Notes and references

High schools in Champaign County, Ohio
Public high schools in Ohio